The 1938 Interstate Grand Prix was a motor race staged at the Wirlinga circuit, near Albury, in New South Wales, Australia on 19 March 1938. 
The race, which was the first Interstate Grand Prix, was contested on a handicap basis over 34 laps, a distance of 148.5 miles.
It was organised by the Victorian Sporting Car Club and was held in conjunction with the 150th celebrations at Albury.

The race was won by Jack Phillips of Wangaratta, driving a Ford V8 Special. Phillips also recorded the fastest race time.

Race results

Notes:
 Race distance: 148.5 miles
 Starters: Unknown
 Finishers: Unknown
 Fastest Time: Jack Phillips (Ford V8 Special), 2:13:15, 67.5 mph
 Teams Prize: Burrows, Bonser & Kieinig

See also
1936 Victorian Sporting Car Club Trophy

References

Interstate Grand Prix